Bapsi Sidhwa (born 11 August 1938) is a Pakistani novelist of Gujarati Parsi Zoroastrian descent who writes in English and is a resident in the United States.

She is best known for her collaborative work with Indo-Canadian filmmaker Deepa Mehta: Sidhwa wrote both the 1991 novel Ice Candy Man which served as the basis for Mehta's 1998 film  Earth as well as the 2006 novel Water: A Novel on which Mehta's 2005 film Water is based. A documentary about Sidhwa's life called "Bapsi: Silences of My Life" is released on the official YouTube channel of " The Citize Archive of Pakistan" on 28 October 2022 with title " First Generation -Stories of partition: Bapsi Sidhwa" .

Background
Sidhwa was born to Parsi Zoroastrian parents Peshotan and Tehmina Bhandara in Karachi, Bombay Presidency, and later moved with her family to Lahore, Punjab Province. She was two years old when she contracted polio (which has affected her throughout her life) and nine in 1947 at the time of Partition (facts which would shape the character Lenny in her novel Cracking India as well as the background for her novel). She received her BA from Kinnaird College for Women University in Lahore, Pakistan, in 1957.

She married at the age of 19 and moved to Bombay for five years before she divorced and remarried in Lahore with her present husband Noshir who is also a Zoroastrian. She had three children before beginning her career as an author. One of her children is Mohur Sidhwa, who is a candidate for state representative in Arizona. She is the Vice-Chair of the Democratic Party of Arizona State.

She currently resides in Houston in the US. She describes herself as a "Punjabi-Parsi". Her first language is Gujarati, her second language is Urdu, and her third language is English. She can read and write best in English, but she is more comfortable talking in Gujarati or Urdu, and often translates literally from Gujarati or Urdu to English.

Teaching
She has previously taught at the University of Houston, Rice University, Columbia University, Mount Holyoke College, and Brandeis University.

Awards
Bunting Fellowship at Radcliffe/Harvard (1986)
Visiting Scholar at the Rockefeller Foundation Center, Bellagio, Italy, (1991)
Sitara-i-Imtiaz (Star of Excellence) Award, (1991, Pakistan's highest national honor in the arts)
Lila Wallace-Reader's Digest Writer's Award (1994)
 Mondello Prize (Premio Mondello for Foreign Authors) for Water (2007)
 Inducted in the Zoroastrian Hall of Fame (2000)

Works
The city of Lahore, Pakistan, where she was brought up, is central to her four novels below:
Their Language of Love : published by Readings Lahore (2013, Pakistan.)
Jungle Wala Sahib (Translation) (Urdu) : Published by Readings Lahore (2012, Pakistan)
City of Sin and Splendour : Writings on Lahore (2006, US)
 Water: A Novel (2006, US and Canada)
Bapsi Sidhwa Omnibus (2001, Pakistan)
An American Brat (1993, U.S.; 1995, India)
Cracking India (1991, U.S.; 1992, India; originally published as Ice Candy Man, 1988, England)
The Bride  (1982, England; 1983;1984, India; published as The Pakistani Bride, 1990 US and 2008 US)
The Crow Eaters (1978, Pakistan; 1979 &1981, India; 1980, England; 1982, US)

References

External links 
 Literary Encyclopedia
 
 Sense of the City: Lahore (BBC Online article by Bapsi Sidhwa

1938 births
Parsi writers
Living people
Kinnaird College for Women University alumni
University of Houston faculty
Rice University faculty
Columbia University faculty
Mount Holyoke College faculty
American people of Gujarati descent
American people of Parsi descent
Parsi people
Pakistani Zoroastrians
Pakistani dramatists and playwrights
Pakistani novelists
Recipients of Sitara-i-Imtiaz
English-language writers from Pakistan
Writers from Lahore
Pakistani women writers
Pakistani emigrants to the United States
Pakistani expatriates in India
Pakistani people of Gujarati descent
Pakistani women's rights activists